Live Music is a reggaeton company founded by DJ Giann and Jowell in 1996.

Artists
Jowell & Randy
Yomo
Franco "El Gorila"

Music Producer
DJ Giann
Mr.Greenz
Dexter & Mr.Greenz (as a production duo)

Former Producers & Artists
 DJ Blass
 DJ Secuaz (1989 - 2013)
 Dirty Joe
 Lelo & Jazzy (Los Hitmen)
 El Polakan
 De La Ghetto
 Galante "El Emperador"

Albums/Mixtapes Released After 2011
Randy "Nota Loca" & Galante "El Emperador" - Una Nota Con Elegancia (2011)
Guelo Star - Yums: The Mixtape (2012)
Galante "El Emperador" - Tu Juguetito Sexual (2012)
Guelo Star - The Movie Man (2012)
Dj Secuaz - Zona De Perreo (2012) 
 Jowell & Randy - Pre Doxis (2013)
 Jowell & Randy - Imperio Nazza: Doxis Edition (2013)  
 Jowell & Randy - Sobredoxis (2013)
 Back To The Underground : The Mixtape (2013)
 Falo - Back To The Underground : Falo-Edition (2013)
 OG Black - Back To The Underground: El Francotirador Edition
 Maicol & Manuel - Back To The Underground: Yakaliando Edition
 Back To The Underground La Realeza Edition (2013)
 Watussi - La Revelacion Del Under (2013)
 Guelo Star - Yums 2 (2013)
 Back To The Underground - Polakan Edition (2013)
 Back To The Underground - Frankie Boy Edition (2013)

Record labels established in 2006